Fucked Up is a Canadian hardcore punk band from Toronto, Ontario, formed in 2001. The band consists of Damian Abraham (vocals), Mike Haliechuk (guitar, vocals), Josh Zucker (guitar), Sandy Miranda (bass), and Jonah Falco (drums, vocals). From 2007 to 2021, the band also included guitarist and vocalist Ben Cook.

To date, the band has released five studio albums, alongside several EPs, singles, and companion releases. The band won the 2009 Polaris Music Prize for their second studio album, The Chemistry of Common Life.

History

2001–2007 
The band formed and played their first shows in early 2001. The initial practicing lineup consisted of 10,000 Marbles (Mike Haliechuk, lead guitar), Concentration Camp (Josh Zucker, rhythm guitar, vocals), Mustard Gas (Sandy Miranda, bass guitar), and Chris Colohan (of Left For Dead/The Swarm fame, who was lead vocalist for Cursed). Just prior to recording their demo tape, vocal duties were taken over from Colohan by Pink Eyes (Damian Abraham, also known as Mr. Damian). Drums were played by Mr. Jo (Jonah Falco, also credited as G. Beat or J. Falco).

Following the release of the demo, the band embarked on a long series of 7-inch records. The band released the "No Pasaran" 7-inch in May 2002. The Police 7-inch was released in March 2003, quickly followed the Baiting the Public 7-inch in May 2003. Two more 7-inches followed in 2004, the single Dance of Death, and the 4-song EP Litany. The vinyl releases to this point were collected on 2004s Epics in Minutes CD. The band was the subject of a two-minute 16 mm film showing its links to the Toronto hardcore scene, a local infoshop and punk radio show.

The band's use of imagery and symbolism (notable the use of Sigils) took a decided turn after the release of Epics in Minutes, as it was followed by two limited 12-inches, the Looking for Gold 12-inch, and the live Let Likes be Cured by Likes 12-inch. The Looking for Gold 12-inch contained no liner notes or credits, no song titles, and a hidden track. It was self-released by the band in 2004 in two limited runs of 300 and 400 copies. The title track was 16 minutes long, used 18 guitar tracks, had a three-minute drum solo and contained 5 minutes of whistling.

In the summer of 2004, the band released the Generation 7-inch and 12-inch EPs. After touring for most of 2005 the band took on David Eliade as a quasi-full-time manager/promoter. In early 2006 Eliade began shopping demos of songs from the planned Hidden World album to labels, ending with the band signing to Jade Tree Records for an early fall 2006 release of the album. Jade Tree is distributed by Touch & Go which in turn has a distribution agreement with ADA (Warner Music Group). Jade Tree licensed the vinyl version to Deranged Records, which released it as a double album in November 2006.

Several other records, such as Year of the Dog 12-inch were released, before the band went on the European tour, visiting England, Germany, and Spain, among other places. January 16, 2007, marked the band's live television debut on MTV Live, where they were introduced as "Effed Up". During their performance of their song "Baiting the Public", the majority of the audience were moshing and causing damage to the set (also visible was a cut on Damian's forehead), resulting in a sum of $2,000 in damages. This performance sparked controversy and resulted in MTV Canada banning moshing from future MTV Live performances. In November 2007, the band played a show in New York that was filmed for the movie Burn, directed by Richard Roepnack.  The performance was positively reviewed in The New York Times, although the Times chose not to print the band's name, referring to them instead as a string of asterisks.

2008–present

On October 9, 2008, the band returned to MTV Live, this time performing in the men's washroom. Once again, the band (and their fans) caused a large amount of damage, destroying the ceiling, spray painting walls and knocking over amps and a motorcycle which was brought into the washroom as a prop. Fans, who were told beforehand to stay out of the washroom and to watch from outside the door, rushed the doors and joined in the destruction the band had already started. The band was supposed to play three songs but were stopped after the first song as MTV was not aware of the destruction the band had planned and were concerned about the safety of the band, audience and crew.
On October 10 Abraham blogged about the performance on the MTV Live website, saying the bathroom performance was "f**king out of control terrifying."

The band signed to Matador Records in Spring of 2008. That summer, Matador reissued the "Year Of The Pig" 12-inch single. This time it came out with additional formats including a series of three 7-inches, for the US, UK and Japan respectively, each with a different edit of the A-side and a new B-side. A CDEP compiled all the versions from the various vinyl versions. The band toured extensively in the UK behind this release, following it with a trip up the West Coast.

On October 7, 2008, Matador released Fucked Up's second album, The Chemistry Of Common Life. The album received near-universal critical acclaim from publications such as the NME, The New York Times, Blender, Pitchfork, Alternative Press, Q Magazine, and would later go on to win the 2009 Polaris Music Prize. The band toured the Eastern US in October, including a much-covered 12-hour long show on the Bowery in New York on October 14. They were joined by musical guests including Ezra Koenig of Vampire Weekend, Moby, John Joseph of the Cro-Mags, members of Endless Boogie, Les Savy Fav, Dinosaur Jr., and others.

In November 2008, the band participated with other similarly named bands, including Holy Fuck, Fuck, and Fuck Buttons in the Festival of the Fuck Bands music festival in the village of Fucking, Austria. In 2009 Fucked Up took part in an interactive documentary series called City Sonic.  The series, which featured 20 Toronto artists, had lead singer Damian Abraham inside Rotate This talking about his love of vinyl and punk music.

Fucked Up played the ATP New York 2010 music festival in Monticello, New York in September 2010 as well as an annual Halloween gig in Toronto. In February 2011, the band toured Australia for the first time, as a part of the Soundwave Festival, along with side-shows from the festival with artists as diverse as the Bronx, Terror, H2O, Trash Talk and Polar Bear Club.

The band's third studio album, David Comes to Life, was released in June 2011. A self-professed "rock opera" set in Thatcherite Britain, it tells a story of love, loss and redemption, with the story complicated by misdirection and unreliable narrators. The record debuted at No. 83 on the Billboard 200 in the US and received wide critical acclaim. Spin magazine named David Comes to Life its No. 1 Album of 2011, and put the band on the cover, writing "Fucked Up have synthesized 40 years of rock into what's ostensibly a hardcore record, and in doing so created its own logic." Like the previous release, this album was also nominated for the Polaris Music Prize, the nomination describing the record as "Excessive? Sure. Ridiculous? At times. Brilliant? Sounds pretty damn close to it." They did not win for a second time, being beaten by Feist's album Metals.

In late 2011 the year the band went on hiatus to allow Abraham to raise his family, but they returned in June 2012 to play the Metallica-curated Orion Music + More Festival in Atlantic City, New Jersey, and went on to play Fun Fun Fun Fest in November, 2012, in Austin, Texas.

Fucked Up's fourth LP, named Glass Boys, was released by Matador Records on June 3, 2014. Avatars of the band and their songs "Paper the House" and "Queen of Hearts" were featured in the 2016 video game "Loud on Planet X".

In 2016 the band self-released Zanzibar, a soundtrack, recorded in 2011, to Tod Browning's silent movie from 1928 West of Zanzibar starring Lon Chaney. Their fifth studio album, Dose Your Dreams  was released in October 2018 by Merge Records. Driven by guitarist Haliechuk, it is a concept album focusing on the band's recurring character David, and featuring several guest lead vocalists, alongside Abraham, Falco, and Haliechuk.

The band released their sixth studio album and the ninth installment in the Zodiac series, Year of the Horse, in full on May 7, 2021. It was ranked number eleven on Decibel magazine's list of the "Top 40 Albums of 2021" and seventh on the "10 best albums of 2021" list of The Plain Dealer.

In November 2021, it was revealed that longtime guitarist Ben Cook had left the band, with Haliechuk revealing that Robin Hatch would be replacing him during live performances.

On January 27, 2023, the band released their sixth studio album, One Day.

Lawsuit
In January 2008, Fucked Up, along with Xiu Xiu, filed a lawsuit against Rolling Stone and Camel Cigarettes for an advertisement that included both bands in an Indie Rock Universe special. The advertisement apparently portrayed the bands as supporters of Camel. 

On January 28, 2010, The Court of Appeal of the State of California for the First Appellate District reversed the lower court's ruling, saying constitutional principles of freedom of speech and the press require that the lawsuit be dismissed.

Collaborations 
Fucked Up has collaborated extensively with other artists on record and during live performances.  Hidden World features guest instrumentation from Final Fantasy, as well as guest vocals by Ben Cook of No Warning, two years before he joined Fucked Up, George Pettit and Dallas Green, formerly of Alexisonfire, Chris Colohan of Cursed, and Heidi Hazelton. Year of the Pig was written in part with Max Mccabe-Locos of The Deadly Snakes, who plays piano and organ on the record, and a lead vocal by Jennifer Castle of Castlemusic. In late 2007, the holiday charity single David Christmas featured guest vocals from Nelly Furtado, Davey Havok, David Cross, Shenae Grimes of Degrassi: The Next Generation and Faris Badwan of The Horrors, among others.

Circle Jerks singer Keith Morris has performed live with Fucked Up, singing Backed Against the Wall, Beverly Hills, and the Black Flag song Nervous Breakdown in March 2008, at the Mess With Texas Fest in Austin, Texas, and again on Nervous Breakdown in February 2009, at the Echoplex in Los Angeles. The band were joined by former Dead Kennedys singer Jello Biafra, for their encore of the Ramones' Blitzkrieg Bop at the same Los Angeles gig.

Fucked Up released a second all-star Christmas single in December 2009, this time a cover of Band Aid's Do They Know It's Christmas, featuring Ezra Koenig of Vampire Weekend, the members of Yo La Tengo, David Cross (again), Kevin Drew of Broken Social Scene, Tegan & Sara, Andrew W.K., Bob Mould, Kyp Malone of TV On The Radio, and GZA. Proceeds from the single go to benefit three charitable organizations working to publicize the high disappearance rate of Aboriginal women in Canada.

For Record Store Day in April 2011 Fucked Up released a special exclusive LP entitled David's Town. It is not billed to Fucked Up, and instead pretends to be a compilation album documenting the scene in the fictitious UK city of Byrdesdale Spa, the late '70s setting for the band's upcoming "rock opera" David's Come To Life. Each song featured a guest singer (one was sung by the band's vocalist Abraham, three were sung by other band members), including Danko Jones, Wesley Patrick Gonzalez, Dan Romano, Simone Schmidt, Cee Kay, A.C. Newman and Dylan Baldi.

Television appearances
This is the list of all known appearances of Fucked Up or their songs on mainstream television.

MTV Live Canada - 2 live performances
"Baiting The Public" (from Hidden World) is used in The Bad Girls Club episode 30.
 "Son The Father" (from The Chemistry of Common Life) is used in Friday Night Lights and Skins. It was also used in the film Cedar Rapids (film).
Red Eye host Greg Gutfeld declared The Chemistry of Common Life the best album of 2008 and interviewed Abraham.
George Stroumboulopoulos Tonight Christmas Special 2010
Cedar Rapids 2011, song "Born Again" is featured in a scene.
George Stroumboulopoulos Tonight December 2011
Anthony Bourdain: No Reservations Season 7 Episode 17 "Holiday Special" performing "Jingle Bells" (December 12, 2011)
The Layover Season 2, Episode 5 (December 17, 2012)
The Chris Gethard Show Episode 97 (June 26, 2013)
Billions Season 2, Episode 8 (April 9, 2017)

Members

Current members
 Mike Haliechuk — lead guitar, vocals (2001–present)
 Sandy Miranda — bass guitar, vocals (2001–present)
 Josh Zucker — rhythm guitar, vocals (2001–present)
 Damian Abraham — vocals (2001–present)
 Jonah Falco — drums, vocals (2001–present)

Touring members
Robin Hatch — keyboard, vocals (2022–present)

Former members
 Ben Cook — rhythm guitar, vocals (2007–2021)
 Chris Colohan — drums (2001)

Discography

Studio albums
 Hidden World (2006)
 The Chemistry of Common Life (2008)
 David Comes to Life (2011) 
 Glass Boys (2014)  
 Dose Your Dreams (2018)
 One Day (2023)

Zodiac series
 2006 "Year of the Dog" 12-inch (Blocks Recording Club)
 2008 "Year of the Pig" 12-inch (Vice Records & What's Your Rupture?) + CD (Matador Records)
 2009 "Year of the Rat" 12-inch (What's Your Rupture?)
 2010 "Year of the Ox" 12-inch (Merge Records + Matador Europe)
 2012 "Year of the Tiger" 12-inch (Matador Records)
 2014 "Year of the Dragon" 12-inch (Tankcrimes)
 2015 "Year of the Hare" 12-inch (Deathwish Inc.)
 2017 "Year of the Snake" 12-inch (Tankcrimes)
 2021 "Year of the Horse" 12-inch (Tankcrimes)

Live albums
 2020 Rivoli (Recorded live at The Rivoli Club in Toronto in 2014)
 2020 Live at CBGB's (Recorded live at CBGB's in New York in 2006)
 2021 Live at Third Man Records (Recorded live to acetate at Third Man Records during the fabled 9-piece-band "Zodiac Tour" in the summer of 2015)
 2022 David Comes to LIVE - Live at Warsaw, Brooklyn November 2011 (Recorded live in Warsaw, Brooklyn, NYC November 15, 2011)

Collaborations
 2011 David's Town  (Matador Records)

Compilation albums
 2004 Epics in Minutes CD (Deranged Records)
 2010 Couple Tracks: Singles 2002-2009 CD (Matador Records)
 2022 Do All Words Can Do LP (Matador Records)

Soundtrack album
 2016 Zanzibar (recorded in 2011) (self-released)

Other 12-inches
 2004 Let Likes be Cured by Likes 12-inch (Schizophrenic Records)
 2004 Looking for Gold 12-inch (self-released)
 2005 Generation 12-inch (Slasher Records)
 2005 Litany + 1 12-inch (Test Pattern)
 2009 Bruises - Live in Muenster Germany 12-inch (Slowboy Records)
 2011 Coke Sucks, Drink Pepsi - Live 12-inch (Chunklet)
 2013 21st Century Cling-Ons on Sugar Daddy Live Split Series Vol. 8 split 12-inch with the Melvins (Amphetamine Reptile Records)
 2016 This Mother Forever 12-inch (self-released)

Singles, EPs, demos, mixtapes, splits, and tapes
 2001 Demo 2001 cassette (Breakout Fanzine)
 2002 Demo tape (self-released)
 2002 No Pasaran 7-inch (Deranged Records)
 2003 Police 7-inch (Deranged Records)
 2003 Baiting the Public 7-inch (Deranged Records)
 2003 Generation/Last Man Standing from Toronto City Omnibus 12-inch (Schizophrenic Records) 
 2003 88 from Town of Hardcore CD (Town of Hardcore fanzine)
 2003 Dance of Death 7-inch (Deranged Records)
 2003 Epics in Minutes 7-inch (self-released)
 2003 Epics in Minutes 7-inch (fake version, self-released) (really Baiting the Public 7-inch)
 2004 Litany 7-inch EP (Test Pattern Records, repressed on Havoc in 2006)
 2004 Split with Haymaker 7-inch (Deep Six Records)
 2005 Dangerous Fumes 7-inch (fake version, self-released) (really Baiting the Public 7-inch)
 2005 Generation 7-inch (Slasher Records)
 2005 Mix Tape Volume One cassette tape (Hidden World/Deranged Records)
 2005 Black Cross 7-inch (Burning Sensation)
 2005 Black Army 7-inch (Burning Sensation)
 2005 Dropout from Generations: A Hardcore Compilation CD (Revelation Records)
 2005 Search For The Words / Dance Of Death (Original Rough Mix) from Pink Eye Club Chi-Town Get Down CDR (self-released)
 2006 Try a Little Togetherness from Killed by Canada CD (Fans Of Bad Productions)
 2006 Fucked Up Tape cassette tape (Harsh Brutal Cold Productions - reissued by Trujaca Fala Records in 2007)
 2006 Triumph of Life 7-inch (Peter Bower Records / Vice Records UK)
 2006 Triumph of Life 3 song CD (Go Down Fighting Records / Vice Records UK)
 2006 Dangerous Fumes 7-inch (Deranged Records)
 2006 Dangerous Fumes 7-inch (Hate Records; German Edition)
 2006 Split with Think I Care 7-inch (Town of Hardcore)
 2006 Mix Tape Volume II cassette tape (Deranged Records)
 2006 Dolly Mixture 7-inch (Fucked Up Records) - two covers of Dolly Mixture
 2006 Shop Assistants 7-inch (Fucked Up Records) - two covers of The Shop Assistants
 2006 Humos Peligrosos 7-inch (La Vida es un Mus) - actually a different version of Dangerous Fumes 7-inch
 2006 Fums Perillosos 7-inch (La Vida es un Mus) - actually a different version of Dangerous Fumes 7-inch
 2006 Hoxton Cunts 7-inch ("Random 7-inch's that have fake covers and labels on it done to make fun of the band and Vice Records.")
 2006 Two Snakes 7-inch (Fucked Up Records)
 2006 Since U Been Gone 10-inch/12" (bootleg)
 2007 Hidden World 8 Track (Welfare Records)
 2007 Toronto FC 7-inch Split with Hard Skin (No Future)
 2007 Year of the Pig 12-inch (What's Your Rupture?)
 2007 David Christmas 7-inch (Hidden World Records)
 2008 2007 Halloween Weekend DVD
 2008 Year of the Pig American Edit 7-inch (Matador Records / What's Your Rupture)
 2008 Year of the Pig UK Edit 7-inch (Matador Records / What's Your Rupture)
 2008 Year of the Pig Japanese Edit 7-inch (Matador Records / What's Your Rupture)
 2008 Baiting the Public (Recorded Live in The Pit at KFJC, Los Altos Hills, CA.) from Live At The Devil's Triangle Vol 11 CD (KFJC)
 2008 Job from Killed by Trash 2 LP (P. Trash Records)
 2008 Crooked Head/I Hate Summer 7-inch (Matador Records)
 2008 Royal Swan 7-inch split with Katie Stelmanis 7-inch (Matador Records)
 2009 Two Snakes 7-inch (HG Fact)
 2009 Mixtape No. 3 (self-released)
 2009 No Epiphany 7-inch (Matador Records)
 2009 Singles Compilation Tape (Trujaca Fala)
 2009 Singles Compilation CD (HG Fact)
 2009 Neat Parts digital single (Matador Records)
 2009 Do They Know It's Christmas? digital single (Matador Records)
 2009 Son of Sam on Shred Yr Face Vol. 2 7-inch Split with Rolo Tomassi and The Bronx (Matador Records)
 2010 Couple Tracks 7-inch (Matador Records)
 2010 @WFMU 10-inch (recorded in 2007) (Altamont)
 2010 Daytrotter Sessions 7-inch (two-song bootleg)
 2010 Daytrotter Sessions 7-inch (three-song official release for Record Store Day) (Matador Records)
 2010 Reel Live reel-to-reel tape (Welfare Records)
 2010 Here Lies Are split with Serena Maneesh 12-inch (Best of Both Records)
 2010 Lazer Attack from Untitled 21: A Juvenile Tribute to the Swingin' Utters CD (Red Scare Industries)
 2010 Baiting the Public (Recorded Live On KBOO 90.7 FM PDX) from Mixed Combat Vol.1 cassette tape (Life During Wartime)
 2010 Hotel California from Metal Hard Rock Covers 353 CD (this recording is by a different band entirely unrelated to this one
 2010 Live On CBC Radio 3 May/6/2008 digital single (Free Music Archive)
 2011 Mixtape No. 4 (self-released)
 2011 The Other Shoe digital single (Matador Records)
 2011 A Little Death digital single (Matador Records)
 2011 Ship Of Fools digital single (Matador Records)
 2011 Queen Of Hearts digital single (Matador Records)
 2011 The Other Shoe UK tour 7-inch (self-released)
 2011 Byrdesdale Garden City 7-inch (Matador Records)
 2011 Do All Words Can Do 7-inch (Matador Records)
 2011 Remember Me (That's All I Ask) 7-inch (Matador Records)
 2011 Turn The Season 7-inch (Matador Records)	
 2011 Octavio Made The Bomb 7-inch (Matador Records)
 2011 Full Ripe split 7-inch (bootleg) (really a fake with no connection to the band)
 2011 Jingle Bells benefit 7-inch split with Sloan (self-released)
 2012 Clap, Clap, Clap from Rated G.G. 7-inch (WFMU)
 2012 I Hate Summer (Live) 7-inch split with The Dirtbombs (Bruise Cruise Records)
 2012 What Would You Do (For Veronica) ? 7-inch split with Yamantaka/Sonic Titan (Polaris)
 2013 Walking on (Crooked) Sunshine from BrooklynVegan Presents Sun Salute CD (Primary Wave)
 2014 Year of the Dragon 7-inch (Tankcrimes)
 2014 Glass Boys (Slow Version) CD/LP (Matador Records)
 2014 Paper the House 7-inch (Matador Records)
 2014 Led by Hand 7-inch (Matador Records)
 2014 Sun Glass 7-inch (Matador Records)
 2014 The Art of Patrons 7-inch (Matador Records)
 2014 Blink/The Way We Did 7-inch (self-released)
 2014 Mixtape No. 5 (self-released)
 2014 Voce Rubata from Broadsheet Music: A Year In Review (really a Jonah Falco solo effort released under the Fucked Up moniker) CD (Arts & Crafts)
 2015 Our Own Blood 7-inch (self-released)
 2016 Cream Puff War from Day of the Dead CD/LP (4AD)
 2018 Raise Your Voice Joyce/Taken 7-inch (Merge Records/Arts & Crafts)
 2020 Mixtape No. 6 (self-released)

 Music videos 
 "Crooked Head" (2008)
 "Queen of Hearts" (2011)
 "The Other Shoe" (2011)
 "Do You Feed ? (The Curry Song)" (2011)
 "Turn the Season" (2012)
 "Inside A Frame" (2012)
 "Paper the House" (2014)
 "Led by Hand" (2014)
 "Sun Glass" (2014) 
 "The Art of Patrons" (2014)
 "Year of the Hare" (2015)
 "Normal People" (2018)
 "Accelerate" (2018)
 "Dose Your Dreams" (2019)

Motion pictures
 Burn (2007)
 The Last Pogo Jumps Again'' (2013)

See also

 Canadian rock

References

External links

 Official website
 
 Fucked Up official Blog
 Alternative Fucked Up Blog (by Damian)

Musical groups established in 2001
Canadian hardcore punk groups
Musical groups from Toronto
Polaris Music Prize winners
Jade Tree (record label) artists
2001 establishments in Ontario
Merge Records artists